The ASTRA Award for Favourite Program is an award presented at the ASTRA Awards since 2004.

Overview
 Award titles
 Favourite Australian Production (2004)
 Favourite Program (2005–present)

Recipients

 Each year is linked to the article about the ASTRA Awards held that year.

References

Awards established in 2005